WKNO may refer to:

WKNO (TV), a television station (channel 10 analog/29 digital) licensed to Memphis, Tennessee, United States
WKNO-FM, a radio station (91.1 FM) licensed to Memphis, Tennessee, United States